Atriplex lindleyi is a species of saltbush known by the common name Lindley's saltbush. It is native to Australia, where it is widespread, especially in dry areas. It is known elsewhere as an introduced species, in California and the United States an invasive species.

Description
This is an annual or perennial herb producing brittle, scaly whitish stems erect or spreading to lengths between 10 and 40 centimeters. The leaves are greenish white, scaly, and often toothed along the edges. They are widely lance-shaped to diamond in shape and up to 3 or 4 centimeters long.

Male flowers are located in leaf axils or in spikelike inflorescences. Female flowers are generally held in small clusters below the male clusters in the leaf axils. The female inflorescence has spongy bracteoles up to a centimeter long and inflated around the flowers.

References

External links
Jepson Manual Treatment
USDA Plants Profile

New South Wales Flora
Flora of North America

lindleyi
Endemic flora of Australia
Flora of New South Wales
Flora of the Northern Territory
Flora of Queensland
Flora of South Australia
Flora of Victoria (Australia)
Eudicots of Western Australia